Calgro is an unincorporated community in Tulare County, California, United States. The name of the community comes from an acronym for the California Growers Wineries.

References

Unincorporated communities in Tulare County, California
Unincorporated communities in California